The Haina River is a river of the Dominican Republic. It is located on the oriental limit of hydrographic district of Azua, Baní, and San Cristóbal.

In 1496, according to Floyd, "Miguel Diaz and Francisco de Garay, working their way down the Haina river, discovered rich deposits of gold in the river sands perhaps twenty-five miles from the coast."  Bartolome Colon built a fort along this river, "well situated within the gold region", which he named San Cristobal.

Overview 
Haina River has a length of 86 km. It starts in Loma El Zumbador of Lomas de Maimón in the Central Mountainrange, Northwest of Villa Altagracia. The river empties in the Caribbean Sea, east of the municipality Bajos de Haina, 14 km west of the Ozama River.

Etymology
Granberry and Vescelius suggest a Macoris etymology for the name haina, comparing it with ha-ina 'many nets' in the purportedly related Warao language of the Orinoco Delta.

See also
List of rivers of the Dominican Republic

References

 The Columbia Gazetteer of North America. 2000.
 GEOnet Names Server
CIA map

Rivers of the Dominican Republic